Durham City Rugby Football Club is a rugby union club based in the city of Durham, County Durham. The first XV currently play in North 1 East, a sixth tier league in the English rugby union system. The club runs several senior teams, a colts side and the full range of junior sides.

League history
When league rugby was introduced in 1987, Durham City was allocated a place in the fourth tier, playing in Area 4 North, ending the first season as runners-up. The club stayed at that level until 1993 when a league restructure by the RFU saw the club placed in a new fifth tier - Courage League Division 5. However the club was relegated from that league after just one season and the club has subsequently played in the regional leagues, fluctuating between North 1 East and Durham/Northumberland 1.

Club honours

Durham County RFU Senior Cup winners (19): 1885, 1888, 1910, 1921, 1929, 1932, 1933, 1934, 1936, 1953, 1957, 1958, 1962, 1963, 1964, 1965, 1966, 1967, 1988
Durham/Northumberland 1 champions (2): 2015–16, 2018–19

References

External links
  Official club site

English rugby union teams
Rugby union in County Durham
Durham, England